Evacuation simulation is a method to determine evacuation times for areas, buildings, or vessels.  It is based on the simulation of crowd dynamics and pedestrian motion. 

The distinction between buildings, ships, and vessels on the one hand and settlements and areas on the other hand is important for the simulation of evacuation processes.  In the case of the evacuation of a whole district, the transport phase (see emergency evacuation) is usually covered by queueing models (see below).

Simulations are not primarily methods for optimization. To optimize the geometry of a building or the procedure with respect to evacuation time, a target function has to be specified and minimized. Accordingly, one or several variables must be identified which are subject to variation.

Classification of models 
Modelling approaches in the field of evacuation simulation:
 Cellular automaton: discrete, microscopic models, where the pedestrian is represented by a cell state.  There exist models for ship evacuation processes, bi-directional pedestrian flows, general models with bionics aspects
 Agent-based models: microscopic models, where the pedestrian is represented by an agent. The agents can have human attributes besides the coordinates. Their behavior can integrate stochastic nature. There exist general models with spatial aspects of pedestrian steps
 Social Force Model: continuous, microscopic model, based on equations from physics
 Queuing models: macroscopic models which are based on the graphical representation of the geometry. The movement of the persons is represented as a flow on this graph.
 Particle swarm optimization models: microscopic model, based on a fitness function which minimizes some properties of the evacuation (distance between pedestrians, distance between pedestrians and exits)
 Fluid-dynamic models: continuous, macroscopic models, where large crowds are modeled with coupled, nonlinear, partial differential equations

Simulation of evacuations 
Buildings (train stations, sports stadia), ships, aircraft, tunnels, and trains are similar concerning their evacuation: the persons are walking towards a safe area. In addition, persons might use slides or similar evacuation systems and for ships the lowering of life-boats.

Tunnels 
Tunnels are unique environments with their own specific characteristics: underground spaces, unknown to users, no natural light, etc. which affect different aspects of evacuees behaviours such as pre-evacuation times (e.g. occupants' reluctance to leave the vehicles), occupant–occupant and occupant–environment interactions, herding behaviour and exit selection.

Ships 
Four aspects are particular for ship evacuation:
 Ratio of number of crew to number of passengers,
 Ship motion,
 Floating position
 The evacuation system (e.g., slides, life-boats).

Ship motion and/or abnormal floating position may decrease the ability to move. This influence has been investigated experimentally and can be taken into account by reduction factors.

The evacuation of a ship is divided into two separate phases: assembly phase and embarkation phase.

Aircraft 
The American Federal Aviation Administration requires that aircraft have to be able to be evacuated within 90 seconds.  This criterion has to be checked before approval of the aircraft.

The 90-second rule requires the demonstration that all passengers and crew members can safely abandon the aircraft cabin in less than 90 seconds, with half of the usable exits blocked, with the minimum illumination provided by floor proximity lighting, and a certain age-gender mix in the simulated occupants.

The rule was established in 1965 with 120 seconds, and has been evolving over the years to encompass the improvements in escape equipment, changes in cabin and seat material, and more complete and appropriate crew training.

References

Literature 
 A. Schadschneider, W. Klingsch, H. Klüpfel, T. Kretz, C. Rogsch, and A. Seyfried. Evacuation Dynamics: Empirical Results, Modeling and Applications. In R.A. Meyers, editor, Encyclopedia of Complexity and System Science. Springer, Berlin Heidelberg New York, 2009. (to be published in April 2009, available at arXiv:0802.1620v1).
 Lord J, Meacham B, Moore A, Fahy R, Proulx G (2005). Guide for evaluating the predictive capabilities of computer egress models, NIST Report GCR 06-886. http://www.fire.nist.gov/bfrlpubs/fire05/PDF/f05156.pdf
 E. Ronchi, P. Colonna, J. Capote, D. Alvear, N. Berloco, A. Cuesta. The evaluation of different evacuation models for road tunnel safety analyses. Tunnelling and Underground Space Technology Vol. 30, July 2012, pp74–84. 
 Kuligowski ED, Peacock RD, Hoskins, BL (2010). A Review of Building Evacuation Models NIST, Fire Research Division. 2nd edition. Technical Note 1680 Washington, US.
 International Maritime Organization (2007). Guidelines for Evacuation Analyses for New and Existing Passenger Ships, MSC/Circ.1238, International Maritime Organization, London, UK.
 R. Lovreglio, E. Ronchi, M. J. Kinsey (2019). An online survey of pedestrian evacuation model usage and users. Fire Technology. https://doi.org/10.1007/s10694-019-00923-8

Emergency simulation
Stochastic simulation
Social physics